The first South Dakota class was a group of six battleships that were laid down in 1920 for the U.S. Navy, but were never completed; designed to achieve , they represented an attempt to catch up with the increasing fleet speeds of its main rivals, the British Royal Navy and Imperial Japanese Navy.

The South Dakotas were authorized in 1917, but work was postponed so that the U.S. Navy could incorporate information gained from the Battle of Jutland, fought in mid-1916, in their design. Work was further postponed to give destroyers and other small fighting vessels priority as they were needed urgently to fight German U-boats in the North Atlantic. Construction started only in 1920. The unfinished hulls were scrapped the following year, the guns were transferred to the U.S. Army and their boilers and armor were used to modernize older battleships.

Background and design history
Before World War I began in August 1914, the Navy was not well funded by the U.S. Congress, which had failed to heed the General Board's recommendation of a building program of two battleships per year. The election of President Woodrow Wilson in 1912 and his appointment of Josephus Daniels as Secretary of the Navy did nothing to change that as neither man believed that additional expenditures on the Navy were worthwhile. The start of the war began to change that attitude and, in early 1915, the General Board called for construction of four battleships in Fiscal Year (FY) 1916, although the Committee on Naval Affairs rejected that recommendation on the basis that it was not prudent to make changes to the existing program before enough had been learned from the experiences of the war. In parallel with this there arose a belief that a victorious Imperial Germany might be able to invade the United States, including a movie that showed victorious Germans executing Civil War veterans, and that the Navy was unprepared to deal with such a threat.

Events abroad like the Japanese Twenty-One Demands on China in early 1915, German attempts to begin unrestricted submarine warfare and the sinking of the Lusitania in May exposed US weaknesses to the public eye. They caused Wilson to reconsider his position and he ordered the Secretaries of the Army and Navy to plan for mobilization in July. The General Board argued that the Navy should be the equal to the strongest navy in the world, that of the British, not just to the most likely enemy, Imperial Germany, and advocated for construction of 10 battleships over five years, together with battlecruisers and smaller ships. Congress was debating the appropriation bill while the Battle of Jutland occurred in at the end of May 1916 and the British victory confirmed the value of the battleship in eyes of the Congressmen. They compressed the General Board's program into three years with four ships in FY 1917 and three in each of the following years. The first four ships, which became the  Colorado-class, were only modest improvements over the preceding , but the changed attitude towards battleships allowed the General Board to propose much more powerful, and expensive, ships for the last two batches. The maximum price was set at $21,000,000.

The General Board's requirements were not thoroughly spelled out at the beginning of the design process and it requested a main armament of a dozen  guns and higher speed than the existing 21 knots of the earlier ships to counter trends it saw in fast foreign battleships like the British  and the Japanese es. Despite this, higher speed was not a high priority and the board settled for a modest increase of two knots. After a flirtation with a design armed with twelve guns in six twin-gun turrets that came out much larger than desired, successful long-range gunnery trials with the triple turrets used by  caused the Preliminary Design section of the Bureau of Construction and Repair (C&R) to choose four triple gun-turrets for the new ships. This allowed them to base the design on an enlarged version of the Colorados, substituting triple turrets for the twin turrets of the older ships. This increase in the number of main guns was a continuation of Navy practice from the beginning of the dreadnought era. The General Board selected the newly developed 50-caliber Mark 2 gun rather than the older 45-caliber Mark 1 gun because it was much more powerful at a minimal cost in weight. Daniels approved the preliminary characteristics on 20 November 1916 although the Bureau of Ordnance and (C&R) argued about the number and placement of the 51-caliber  secondary armament for several months before compromising on 20 guns in a mixture of single and twin mounts when the General Board approved the design on 24 January 1917. American entry into the war in April caused the suspension of all capital ship construction in favor of smaller ships more immediately useful to the war effort, although this allowed the Navy to modify the design based on experience gained from the British.

By this time the design was restricted by the limitations imposed by the requirement to the ability to pass through the Panama Canal, a fundamental part of the Navy's strategy as it saved weeks of time when ships had to transfer from the Pacific Ocean to the Atlantic or vice versa. In the meantime the General Board had decided that upon a plethora of changes of which the most significant were substituting a more powerful, but slower firing,  gun for the five-inch guns, thicker deck armor outside the citadel and increased elevation for the sixteen-inch guns. The board rejected this more expensive design and held to most of its requirements; Daniels approved these changes on 29 January 1918. Taylor investigated sloping the armor, which promised to save a lot of weight, but ultimately decided not to do so. This allowed Taylor to add an aft armored transverse bulkhead and armor for the boiler uptakes.

The design characteristics of the South Dakotas closely followed the standard-type battleship, albeit at a greater scale. Like the Tennessees and Colorados, they were designed with the same bridges, lattice masts and turbo-electric propulsion system and they used the same torpedo protection system as the latter class.

Description

Their crew would have consisted of 137 officers, 1,404 enlisted men and 75 marines.

Propulsion
Turbo-electric propulsion, which the U.S. Navy had adopted for capital ships with the earlier , was continued in this class. One advantage of turbo-electric drive was that the substitution of flexible electric cables for bulky steam-lines allowed the motors to be mounted further to the stern of the ship; this reduced vibration and weight by shortening the propeller shafts. Another was the ability to go astern at full power without needing a separate reverse turbine to do so, simply by reversing the electrical polarity of the motors. Other benefits were the ability to operate all four propellers if one of the turbo generators failed, and the possibility of operating only some of the generators at low speed with suitably higher loading and greater efficiency. "[Turbo-electric drive] was efficient, rugged and always reliable. But it was also heavy, intricate, and not easy to maintain and keep tuned up." The machinery also required special ventilation measures to dissipate heat and to keep out any salt air. Even with this and elaborate insulation measures, protection from moisture or from flooding due to battle damage or other causes remained problematic and it posed the danger of high voltage to the crew if damaged.

In the South Dakotas, two turbo generators (General Electric for Indiana and Montana, Westinghouse for the others) were coupled to a pair of AC alternators of 28,000 KVA and 5,000 volts. The uptakes from each trio of boilers were grouped together and then all four uptakes were trunked together above the upper deck into the single funnel. The ships were also fitted with eight  DC turbo generators.

Armament

The main battery of the South Dakota-class ships consisted of a dozen 16-inch Mark 2 guns in four triple-gun turrets, a pair of superfiring turrets fore and aft of the superstructure. The Mark 2 ended up not being fitted aboard any ship; when the design of the  began in 1938 it was initially assumed these ships would use the surplus Mark 2 guns, but due to a miscommunication between the two Navy departments involved in the design, the Iowas required a lighter gun than the Mark 2/Mark 3 which led to the design of the  16"/50 caliber Mark 7 gun. 

The South Dakotas had a secondary armament that consisted of sixteen 53-caliber six-inch Mark 12 guns in single mounts. A dozen of these were in unarmored casemates on the side of the superstructure and the remaining four guns were positioned abreast the forward superstructure. They were installed in s and several large submarines built during the 1920s after the South Dakotas were canceled.

Anti-aircraft defense was provided by four 50-caliber  dual-purpose guns in single mounts amidships. The ships were also fitted with a pair of  submerged torpedo tubes, one on each broadside.

Protection
It extended between the fore and aft turret barbettes and protected the propulsion machinery and magazines. Fore and aft transverse  bulkheads formed an armored citadel by closing off the ends of the belt.

The conning tower armor was 16 inches thick on the front and sides and it had an 8-inch roof. The outermost compartment was empty, the three middle ones were used as oil tanks, and the innermost one was also empty.

Ships in class

With the cancellation of the South Dakotas and the s, the existing guns were transferred to the U.S. Army and used as coast-defense guns.

Notes

Citations

Bibliography

External links

 
 South Dakota class contract plans

Battleship classes
Cancelled ships of the United States Navy